Hunter Clark (born 26 March 1999) is a professional Australian rules footballer with the St Kilda Football Club in the Australian Football League (AFL). He was drafted by St Kilda with their first selection and seventh overall in the 2017 national draft.

Early life 
Clark is from Mount Martha on the Mornington Peninsula and played junior football with the Mount Martha Football Club. As a boy, Clark was fascinated by jungle animals and wildlife. Clark attended Padua College with fellow footballer Tom De Koning.

AFL career 
In round 13 of the 2018 season, Clark was nominated for the AFL Rising Star after a 17-disposal performance in St Kilda's win against . He ultimately played 15 games in his debut season.

The 2019 season began quietly for Clark who was left out of the senior side for the first two rounds due to form. Clark played rounds three and four, before being dropped again for two games and making a return in round seven. Clark was dropped for rounds 8-12, but returned in round 13 and played every game until the end of the season. In the second half of the season, Clark had improved considerably and averaged 20 disposals, five marks and four intercepts a game. Two standout games came in round 17 against Geelong where he had 25 disposals and laid nine tackles, and round 18 against the Bulldogs where he had 26 disposals, three clearances and two goals.

In a Covid-interrupted 2020 season, Clark played largely across half-back but spent increased time in the midfield late in the season. He played 18 of a possible 19 matches for the year, including two finals. Clark was instrumental late in the game to help the Saints defeat the Suns by 4 points in round 10. Clark was one of the best players afield against the win over ladder leaders Port Adelaide in round eight, with a game-high 24 disposals and five rebounds . Clark was selected at half-back in the AFL's 22Under22, a fan-voted award where the AFL's best 22 players under the age of 22 are recognised annually. Clark also finished top three for his team in disposals in the regular season, as well as ground-ball-gets.

Clark had an injury-affected 2021 year, managing only 13 games from a possible 22. Clark suffered multiple jaw fractures in a round 13 game against Adelaide and required surgery to repair the damage. Clark returned in Round 20 to face Carlton, but suffered a concussion in that game. The concussion ultimately ruled Clark out for the remainder of the season. Despite the frustrating season, Clark had some standout performances, in particular a 33 disposal game against Richmond in Round five, and a 26 disposal two goal and six tackle performance against Hawthorn in Round seven.

Statistics
 Statistics are correct to the end of round 7, 2022

|- style="background-color: #EAEAEA"
! scope="row" style="text-align:center" | 2018
|
| 11 || 15 || 3 || 4 || 121 || 110 || 231 || 43 || 42 || 0.2 || 0.3 || 8.1 || 7.3 || 15.4 || 2.9 || 2.8
|- style="background-color: #EAEAEA"
! scope="row" style="text-align:center" | 2019
|
| 11 || 14 || 2 || 4 || 153 || 134 || 287 || 64 || 43 || 0.1 || 0.3 || 10.9 || 9.6 || 20.5 || 4.6 || 3.1
|-
! scope="row" style="text-align:center" | 2020
|
| 11 || 18 || 1 || 1 || 188 || 122 || 310 || 64 || 46 || 0.1 || 0.1 || 10.4 || 6.8 || 17.2 || 3.6 || 2.6
|- style="background-color: #EAEAEA"
! scope="row" style="text-align:center" | 2021
|
| 11 || 13 || 2 ||1 || 154 || 95 || 249 || 53 || 40 || 0.2 || 0.1 || 11.8 || 7.3 || 19.2 || 4.1 || 3.1
|-
! scope="row" style="text-align:center" | 2022
|
| 11 || 0 || – || – || – || – || – || – || – || – || – || – || – || – || – || –
|- class="sortbottom"
! colspan=3| Career
! 60
! 8
! 10
! 616
! 461
! 1077
! 224
! 171
! 0.1
! 0.2
! 10.3
! 7.7
! 18.0
! 3.7
! 2.9
|}

Notes

References

External links

1999 births
Living people
St Kilda Football Club players
Dandenong Stingrays players
Australian rules footballers from Melbourne
People educated at Padua College (Melbourne)
People from Mount Martha, Victoria